The 1996 CFL Draft took place on May 31, 1996. 61 Canadian football players were chosen from eligible Canadian universities as well as Canadian players playing in the NCAA. This would be the last time that a CFL draft would have seven rounds, switching to six rounds in 1997, until the league reverted to seven in 2013. The Edmonton Eskimos obtained the first overall pick, along with Nick Mazzoli, from the Ottawa Rough Riders in exchange for Dan Murphy and Jay Chistenson. In the fifth round, the Montreal Alouettes drafted defensive end James Eggink who had died from cancer in December 1995. The Edmonton Eskimos obtained the first overall pick, along with Nick Mazzoli, from the Ottawa Rough Riders in exchange for Dan Murphy and Jay Chistenson.

Round one

Round two

Round three

Round four

Round five

Round six

Round seven

References 

Canadian College Draft
Cfl Draft, 1996